Rank comparison chart of all armies and land forces of European states.

Officers (OF 1–10) 

Remark:
NATO STANAG 2116 lists Officer Designates (listed here as OF(D)) of some countries alongside OF-1 ranks.

See also 
Comparative army enlisted ranks of Europe
Military rank
Comparative army officer ranks of the Americas
Comparative army officer ranks of Asia
Ranks and insignia of NATO armies officers

Notes

References 
 STANAG 2116 NATO chart

Military comparisons